"Crashing" is a song by American DJ and producer Illenium featuring American musical duo Bahari. It was released on January 25, 2019, as the second single from Illenium's third studio album Ascend.

Background
According to a press release, Illenium said: "I really love how this song turned out, I heard the demo a long time ago, and it always really stuck with me. We started working together a few months later, and they played the idea for me again. I was really stoked I was able to be a part of the record with such amazing people. Working on the song felt natural, and I couldn't have asked for a better duo to work with on it."

And Bahari said in a joint statement: "This song is so close to our hearts. It's been one of our favorite songs we've ever made, and we have been waiting for the perfect time to put it out. Illenium really captured the emotion of what we were trying to portray with the lyrics. We couldn't have dreamed of a better collaboration for this song."

Composition
According to River Beats Dance, the song featured "an upbeat melody, some easy on the ear synths, smooth production, and dreamy vocals".

Music video
The music video was released on April 18, 2019. When cars speeded towards each other on a collision course in the dead of night, Bahari sang under the glow of streetlights. The sonic eloquence offsets the cinematic intensity as the video immediately entrances and engages.

Charts

Weekly charts

Year-end charts

References

2019 songs
Illenium songs
Songs written by Julia Michaels
Songs written by Justin Tranter
Songs written by Tim James (musician)
Songs written by Antonina Armato
Songs written by Illenium